Karugutu is a settlement in the Western Region of Uganda.
The name "Karugutu" applies to;
Karugutu Subcounty seating at Itojo Townboard, one of the three traditional subcounties of Ntoroko County, others being Rwebisengo and Kanara Subcounties.
Karugutu Town Council elevated and separated from Karugutu S/County in 2010 when Ntoroko diatrict was Curved from her Mother district; Bundibugyo.

Location
The geographical coordinates of Karugutu, Uganda are 0°47'22.0"N, 30°13'37.0"E (Latitude:0.789444; Latitude:30.226944).
Karugutu is bordered by Tooro-Semliki Wildlife Reserve in Rwebisengo s/county to the north, Nombe s/County to the east, Kasitu S/county in Bughendera, Bundibugyo district to the south, Kibuuku town council and Bweramule S/County to the west.

Overview
Karugutu town lies along the Fort Portal–Bundibugyo-Lamia Road, where the Karugutu-Ntoroko Road does a T-Off northwards to Mwitanzige or Lake Albert, immediately south of the Tooro-Semliki Wildlife Reserve. The Uganda National Roads Authority (UNRA), has plans to upgrade the  Karugutu–Ntoroko Road, one of 11 "oil roads" to class II bituminous surface, with culverts and drainage channels. The Environmental and Social Impact Assessment (ESIA) for the upgrade of this road was completed in 2017.

The town is the location of Karugutu Training School, an alpine warfare training school, owned, maintained and operated by the Uganda People's Defence Forces (UPDF).

At the end of the Second Congo War (1998-2003), Karugutu was inundated with Congolese refugees that followed the withdrawing UPDF troops.
Also located in Karugutu are;
Head Quatters of Tooro-Semliki Wildlife Reserve.
Head Quatters of the North Rwenzori Forest Reseve.
Now in Nombe Subcounty, the point where the Kicwamba escarpment meets the North Rwenzori Range
e.t.c

Population
In 2012, the population of Karugutu Municipality was estimated at approximately 16,000 people, in about 1,200 households. The town is divided into several administrative wards, including (a) Karugutu Ward (b) Ibanda Ward (c) Nyabuhuru Ward and (d) Kabasingagizi Ward.

See also
 Bundibugyo
 Fort Portal
 Semliki Wildlife Reserve
 Semliki National Park

References

External links
 Uganda Wildlife Authority: Toro Semliki Wildlife Reserve

Populated places in Western Region, Uganda
Ntoroko District